The University of North Carolina School of Social Work is a graduate school offering M.S.W. (Master of Social Work) and Ph.D. degrees. Also offered are dual degree programs coordinated jointly with UNC's School of Public Health, School of Law, School of Government, and Duke University's Divinity School. In 2008, U.S. News & World Report ranked the School of Social Work fourth among social work programs at public universities and eighth out of 165 programs nationwide. The mission of the UNC School of Social Work is to expand knowledge regarding social problems and programs, to educate social workers for advanced practice, and to provide leadership in the development of socially and economically just policies and programs that strengthen individuals, families, groups, organizations, and communities.

Key Programs and Initiatives
 The summer school abroad program has included study in China, Eastern Europe, Cuba, Honduras, Nicaragua, Costa Rica, South Africa, Kenya, Mexico, England, Ireland, and the Netherlands to examine social welfare issues in different societies and gain a deeper understanding of the globalization of social issues.
 Faculty research projects cover a wide range of topics, including family contributions to the success of early childhood programs, the effects of poverty and violence on children, transition to independent living for children in foster care, domestic violence, research on classroom bullying and classroom behavior management, programs aimed at reducing violence in schools and preventing juvenile delinquency, and various projects focused on the needs of senior citizens.

History

The roots of the School of Social Work go deep into the welfare system of North Carolina. In 1919, the State legislature passed a law that required every county to organize for public welfare services and to employ a superintendent of public welfare. Just one year later, in September 1920, the University of North Carolina at Chapel Hill established the School of Public Welfare, which was the forerunner of the present School. From the beginning, the School had a strong commitment to public service with a basic orientation to sociology and social problems. Its mission was to offer instruction in social problems, to prepare students for social work practice and for community leadership, to provide service to North Carolina, and to carry on research and publish findings. The School was productively and cordially related to county welfare departments and to the North Carolina Department of Public Welfare.

In 1932, the School of Public Welfare was expanded into the School of Public Administration, with the Division of Public Welfare and Social Work as one of its components. Later, the Division was known as the Division of Public Welfare and Social Work of the Graduate School. In 1950, by action of the Board of Trustees of the University, the Division became known as the School of Social Work. At this time, the School affiliated with the American Association of Schools of Social Work and the National Association of Schools of Social Administration. In 1952, when these organizations were merged into the Council on Social Work Education (CSWE), the School became an accredited member.

While the School's educational program has changed substantially since it was organized in 1920, there has been consistent emphasis on integrating the essence of academic instruction with the substance of practical field instruction. Public and voluntary agencies have provided field learning experiences in full cooperation with the School. The arrangements for field experience have varied through the years from the concurrent to the block system. The pattern in recent years has been the concurrent system with block placements available on a selective basis.

The School began with a strong commitment to education for the public social services. It shared the post-World War II preoccupation with a clinical emphasis, achieving eminence as a functional casework school. It responded to America's awakening to poverty and civil rights with a range of field and classroom learning opportunities in work with groups and communities. By the early 1970s, it widened its base of instruction. Today, the School seeks to prepare its students for direct practice with individuals, families and groups and macro practice with organizations and communities in the broad areas of public service as well as for the essential programs offered under voluntary auspices.

References

External links
UNC School of Social Work

Schools of social work in the United States
School of Social Work
1950 establishments in North Carolina